Grace Darling (born Grace Foster; November 20, 1893 – October 7, 1963) was an American actress who was active in Hollywood during the silent era. She was best known for her role as Beatrice Fairfax in a 1916 serial of the same name.

Biography 
Darling was reportedly born in New York City. By the mid-1910s, she was under contract at Hearst-Selig, and would write travelogues for Hearst papers from her globe-trotting adventures. She was a bit eccentric, and was known for carrying around a doll dressed in imaginative outfits during the height of her fame. She was sometimes confused for the actress Ruth Darling, who died in a 1918 car crash in San Francisco. She told reporters she married actor Pat Rooney when she was 15 years old; despite their eventual divorce, she was caring for him at the time of his death. She was also married to a Harry Turek of San Francisco.

Selected filmography 

Everyman's Price (1921)
The Common Sin (1920)
The Discarded Woman (1920)
Even as Eve (1920)
False Gods (1919)
Virtuous Men (1919)
Beatrice Fairfax (1916)
The Glass Pistol (1914)
How Men Propose (1913)
The Midget's Revenge (1913)
Pearl as a Detective (1913)
Knights and Ladies (1913)

References 

1893 births
1963 deaths
American film actresses
American silent film actresses
American stage actresses
Actresses from New York City
20th-century American actresses